Subhanpura  is an urban area in the western side of Vadodara City, in the state of Gujarat, in India.

It was a small village, which has merged with the ever growing western part of Vadodara city. Subhanpura is largely residencial with a few shopping malls and cinemas. The majority of the population are workers from the nearby Gujarat Refinery and Indian Petrochemicals Corporation Limited.

Urban and suburban areas of Vadodara